The 1946–47 Illinois Fighting Illini men's basketball team represented the University of Illinois.

Regular season
The 1946-47 season would be the last year that Doug Mills would be the head coach of the Fighting Illini, however; he would remain as the University of Illinois athletic director until 1966.  During his tenure at the helm, Mills' coached 217 games over 11 seasons.  Overall his teams won 151 games and lost only 66, the 151 wins remains 4th all-time in Illini history.  During the Big Ten Conference season, Mills' teams won 88 games while losing only 47. Included in the 88 wins would be back-to-back conference titles in 1942 and 1943 where his teams would go 35-6 overall and 25-2 in the conference.  Amazingly, Mills' three championships ('37, '42, '43) in just 11 years, place him just one behind Harry Combes, his replacement as head coach, for the most conference championships.

An attempt to regroup 'The Whiz Kids' occurred during the 1946-47 season when Ken Menke, Gene Vance, and Andy Phillip returned from their service in World War II. January also saw the return of All-American guard Walt Kirk from his time in military service. Additionally, Dike Eddleman was not available to play until January based on the football team playing in the Rose Bowl. Unfortunately, the chemistry was not the same and the team finished in a tie for second in the conference with a record of 8 wins, 4 losses.  Overall, the team finished with a 14-6 record.  The starting lineup at the beginning of the season included 4 of the 5 Whiz Kids, guards Smiley and Vance, forwards Phillip and Ken Menke and Fred Green at center. However, as January unfolded, Mills would insert Kirk and freshman Bill Erickson into the starting lineup as well.

Roster

Source

Schedule

|-
!colspan=12 style="background:#DF4E38; color:white;"| Non-Conference regular season

|- align="center" bgcolor=""

|-
!colspan=9 style="background:#DF4E38; color:#FFFFFF;"|Big Ten regular season

Bold Italic connotes conference game
												
Source

Player stats

Awards and honors
 Dwight Eddleman
Fighting Illini All-Century team (2005)
Andy Phillip
True Magazine 1st team All-American (1947)
National Association of Basketball Coaches 1st team All-American (1947)
Consensus 2nd team All-American (1947)
Converse Honorable Mention All-American (1947)
Naismith Memorial Basketball Hall of Fame (1961)
Jack Smiley
Helms 3rd Team All-American (1947)
Converse Honorable Mention All-American (1947)
Team Most Valuable Player 
Gene Vance
Converse Honorable Mention All-American (1947)

References

Illinois Fighting Illini
Illinois Fighting Illini men's basketball seasons
1946 in sports in Illinois
1947 in sports in Illinois